The New York Titans are a lacrosse team based in New York City playing in the National Lacrosse League (NLL). The 2009 season was the 3rd in franchise history.

Regular season

Conference standings

Game log
Reference:

Playoffs

Game log
Reference:

Player stats
Reference:

Runners (Top 10)

Note: GP = Games played; G = Goals; A = Assists; Pts = Points; LB = Loose balls; PIM = Penalty minutes

Goaltenders
Note: GP = Games played; MIN = Minutes; W = Wins; L = Losses; GA = Goals against; Sv% = Save percentage; GAA = Goals against average

Transactions

New players
 Dave Stilley - acquired in trade
 Kurtis Wagar - acquired in trade

Players not returning
 Anthony Kelly - traded
 Jamison Koesterer - traded

Trades

Entry draft
The 2008 NLL Entry Draft took place on September 7, 2008. The Titans selected the following players:

Roster

See also
2009 NLL season

References

New York